The narthex is an architectural element typical of early Christian and Byzantine basilicas and churches consisting of the entrance or vestibule, located at the west end of the nave, opposite the church's main altar. Traditionally the narthex was a part of the church building, but was not considered part of the church proper.

In early Christian churches the narthex was often divided into two distinct parts: an esonarthex (inner narthex) between the west wall and the body of the church proper, separated from the nave and aisles by a wall, arcade, colonnade, screen, or rail, and an external closed space, the exonarthex (outer narthex), a court in front of the church facade delimited on all sides by a colonnade as in the first St. Peter's Basilica in Rome or in the Basilica of Sant'Ambrogio in Milan. The exonarthex may have been either open or enclosed with a door leading to the outside, as in the Byzantine Chora Church.

By extension, the narthex can also denote a covered porch or entrance to a building.

Etymology
The original meaning of the Classical Greek word narthex νάρθηξ was "giant fennel".
Derived meanings are from the use of the fennel stalk as thyrsus, as a schoolmaster's cane, as a singlestick for military exercise, or as a splint for a broken limb. The term was also used for a casket for unguents, and hence as the title of a number of medical works. 
Use for the architectural feature of church building is medieval (Byzantine Greek), in use by the 12th century (Etymologicum Magnum). English use dates from the 1670s. It isn't clear how this meaning was derived, allegedly from a resemblance of the entrance area of the church to a hollow stem.
In Modern Greek narthekas (νάρθηκας) no longer has the classical  and is either the porch of a church, as English, or the brace of a sprained wrist or sling of a broken arm. 
 
In English the narthex is now the porch outside the church at the west end, formerly it was a part of the church building itself,
albeit not considered part of the church proper,  used as the place for penitents.

Purpose
The purpose of the narthex was to allow those not eligible for admittance into the general congregation (particularly catechumens and penitents) to hear and partake of the service. The narthex would often include a baptismal font so that infants or adults could be baptized there before entering the nave, and to remind other believers of their baptisms as they gathered to worship. The narthex is thus traditionally a place of penitence, and in Eastern Christianity some penitential services, such as the Little Hours during Holy Week are celebrated there, rather than in the main body of the church. In the Russian Orthodox Church funerals are traditionally held in the narthex.

Later reforms removed the requirement to exclude people from services who were not full members of the congregation, which in some traditions obviated the narthex. Church architects continued, however, to build a room before the entrance of the nave.  This room could be called an inside vestibule (if it is architecturally part of the nave structure) or a porch (if it is a distinct, external structure). Some traditions still call this area the narthex as it represents the point of entry into the church, even if everyone is admitted to the nave itself.

In the Eastern Orthodox Church, the esonarthex and exonarthex had, and still have, distinct liturgical functions. For instance, the procession at the Paschal Vigil will end up at the exonarthex for the reading of the Resurrection Gospel, while certain penitential services are traditionally chanted in the esonarthex.

In some Eastern Orthodox temples, the narthex will be referred to as the trapeza (refectory), because in ancient times, tables would be set up there after the Divine Liturgy for the faithful to eat a common meal, similar to the agape feast of the early church. To this day, this is where the faithful will bring their baskets at Pascha (Easter) for the priest to bless the Paschal foods which they will then take back to their homes for the festive break-fast. Traditionally, the narthex is where candles and prosphora will be sold for offering during Divine Services.

The doorway leading from the narthex to the nave is sometimes referred to as the "Royal Doors", because in major cathedrals (catholica) there were several sets of doors leading into the nave, the central one being reserved only for the use of the Byzantine emperor.

On feast days there will be a procession to the narthex, followed by intercessory prayers, called the Litiy.

In Armenia the local style of narthex is known as a gavit.

See also
 Antechamber
 Cathedral diagram
 Liturgical east and west
 Lobby
 Scarsella
 Westwork

References

Further reading

External links 
 

Church architecture
Eastern Christian liturgy
Architectural elements